Irmak station is a railway station in Irmak, Turkey. TCDD Taşımacılık operates three daily intercity trains from Ankara to Kars, Kurtalan, and Tatvan,

During the expansion of the existing railway within Ankara, Irmak served as the temporary western terminus if these three trains from 2016 until 4 June 2018.

Irmak station was opened on 1 April 1934 by the Turkish State Railways.

References

External links
Irmak station timetable

Railway stations in Kırıkkale Province
Railway stations opened in 1934
1934 establishments in Turkey